J.D. Smith Jr. (July 19, 1931 – April 1, 2015) was an American football running back in the National Football League for the Chicago Bears, San Francisco 49ers, and Dallas Cowboys. He played college football at North Carolina A&T State University.

Early years
Smith attended Sterling High School, where he practiced football, basketball and baseball. He accepted a football scholarship from North Carolina A&T State University.

He was named the starter at fullback as a sophomore, leading the team with 73 carries for 396 yards (5.4 avg.) and 8 touchdowns in 10 games. He led the team again as a senior, appearing in 8 games with 89 carries for 482 yards (5.3 avg.) and 4 touchdowns.

In 1971, he was inducted as an inaugural member into the North Carolina A&T Sports Hall of Fame.

Professional career

Chicago Bears
Smith was selected by the Chicago Bears in the fifteenth round (179th overall) of the 1955 NFL Draft. He spend the year out of football serving his military service in the Korean War.

He returned in 1956, but the team had a surplus of running backs (Rick Casares, Bobby Watkins, John Hoffman, J.C. Caroline and Perry Jeter), so he was moved to the defensive side. He was used as a kick off returner, linebacker and safety, before being waived after the sixth game of the season.

San Francisco 49ers
In 1956, he was claimed off waivers by the San Francisco 49ers and played the remaining 5 games of the season as a reserve defensive back. The next year, he played at left cornerback, registering 2 interceptions and finishing third in the league with a 26.3-yard average in kickoff returns.

In 1958, while he served as a kickoff returner, he was eased into the running back position until the eleventh game of the season when he ran for 113 yards on seven carries, including and 80-yard touchdown. He was dubbed the "Cinderella Workhorse" by 49ers historian Donn Sinn, for his inauspicious route into prominence.

In 1959, Hugh McElhenny was moved to flanker and Smith was named the starter at left halfback alongside Joe Perry. He finished second in the NFL (behind Jim Brown) with 1,036 rushing yards, becoming the second player in franchise history to have a 1,000-yard rushing season (Perry was the first one) and tied a team record with 10 rushing touchdowns. In the following years he played halfback and fullback, leading the team in rushing for 5 consecutive seasons. He also was  a part of the 'Alphabet Backfield', that included Y. A. Tittle, R.C. Owens and C.R. Roberts. In 1964, he was a backup and rushed for 55 yards on 13 carries.

On September 6, 1965, he was traded to the Dallas Cowboys in exchange for a fifth round draft choice (#69-Mel Phillips). At the time he ranked second all-time on the 49ers career rushing list with 4,370 yards.

Dallas Cowboys
In 1965, he was acquired by the Dallas Cowboys to be a backup fullback for Don Perkins. On September 5, 1967, he was released after the team decided to keep rookie running back Craig Baynham.

Personal life
In 1968, he was hired as a scout for the San Francisco 49ers and remained in that post for 7 years. He worked as a security executive at Sears until his retirement in 1991.

Smith died on April 1, 2015, in his home in Oakland, California.

References

External links
Former 49ers RB J.D. Smith Passes Away at 83

1931 births
2015 deaths
Sportspeople from Greenville, South Carolina
Players of American football from South Carolina
American football running backs
North Carolina A&T Aggies football players
Chicago Bears players
San Francisco 49ers players
Dallas Cowboys players
Western Conference Pro Bowl players
San Francisco 49ers scouts